Grind Session is a skateboarding video game developed by Shaba Games and published by Sony Computer Entertainment for the PlayStation. It was released on May 24, 2000 in North America and in August 2000 in Europe.

Gameplay 
Grind Session features six professional skaters and nine hidden characters. The player also has the ability to choose between four custom skaters, and edit their tricks and names.

Reception 

The game received favorable reviews according to the review aggregation website GameRankings. Nearly six months after the game's release, however, Daniel Erickson of NextGen said, "If you've already played out Tony Hawk's Pro Skater, go pick up Street Sk8er 2. At least that plays differently."

The game was a runner-up for GameSpots annual "Best Game Music" and "Best Sports Game (Alternative)" awards among console games, both of which went to Chrono Cross and Tony Hawk's Pro Skater 2. It was also a runner-up for the "Best Extreme Sports Game" award at the Official U.S. PlayStation Magazine 2000 Editors' Awards, which went to SSX.

Notes

References

External links 
 

2000 video games
PlayStation (console) games
PlayStation (console)-only games
Skateboarding video games
Sony Interactive Entertainment games
Video games developed in the United States